The 2012–13 FC Wacker Innsbruck season in association football is the 11th season since the club was reestablished in June 2002.

Review and events

Matches and results

Legend

Bundesliga

League results and fixtures

League table

Overall league table

Summary table

ÖFB-Cup

Squad

Squad, appearances and goals

|}

Notes
1.Wacker Innsbruck goals listed first.
2.Wacker Innsbruck won in a Shoot-out.

Sources

Match reports

Other sources

Wacker Innsbruck
FC Wacker Innsbruck seasons